Thyrassia virescens is a moth in the family Zygaenidae. It was described by George Hampson in 1892 from Sri Lanka. The only known host plant of this insect is Cissus quadrangularis Linnaeus, 1767 (Vitaceae).

References

Moths described in 1892